Omaha Tornado may refer to:

The Omaha Tornado of 1975, which killed three residents and caused more than $1 billion in damage on May 6, 1975
The Omaha Easter Sunday Tornado (1913), which killed 103 people on March 23, 1913